The Sheraton Casablanca Hotel & Towers is a luxury hotel in the Old Medina of Casablanca, Morocco. Operated by Sheraton Hotels and Resorts, the hotel has 286 rooms and is a notable business venue.

In 2001, the hotel had 306 rooms, 32 suites and 4 restaurants, so it is clear that several rooms have since been expanded as there are now 286. The Royal Suite is the finest and most expensive room of the hotel, followed by the Amiri Suite.

The restaurants and bars of the hotel are El Andalous, Sakura, Dafra, Casbar Bar, Patio Bar and Caesar's Club. One of the hotel restaurants serves Moroccan cuisine.

References

External links
 

Hotels in Casablanca
Sheraton hotels